Floscularia is a genus of rotifers belonging to the family Flosculariidae.

The species of this genus are found in Europe and Northern America.

Species:

Floscularia armata 
Floscularia bifida 
Floscularia conifera 
Floscularia curvicornis 
Floscularia decora 
Floscularia janus 
Floscularia longicauda
Floscularia melicerta 
Floscularia noodti 
Floscularia pedunculata 
Floscularia rigens 
Floscularia ringens 
Floscularia wallacei

References

Flosculariidae